Ednor is an unincorporated community in Montgomery County, Maryland, United States.

Ednor had a school as early as 1893 and a post office as early as 1895.

References

Unincorporated communities in Montgomery County, Maryland
Unincorporated communities in Maryland